The 2018 Pan Pacific Swimming Championships, a long course (50 m) event, was held in Tokyo, Japan, from 9 to 14 August 2018.

Qualifying criteria
Unlike the World Championships and Olympic Games, nations can enter as many people as they like in the preliminaries of each event (in most international meets, only two swimmers from each nation are permitted). However, only two swimmers per nation can qualify for the semi-finals and finals. Prior to FINA's creation of semi-finals in the late 1990s, a total of 3 swimmers per country could qualify for the final and consolation heats of an event, with no more than 2 swimmers per country in a final or consolation.

For relays, each country may enter up to one team in each relay event to swim in the final heat and count toward the team score. Countries may also enter a “B” relay that will swim in a preceding heat. These “B” relays may not score points and are not eligible for medals. An NOC may enter up to 1 swimmer per sex (2 total), if they have no swimmers meeting any qualifying B standard.

Participating nations

Results

Men's events

Women's events

Mixed events

Medal table

References

External links
 Official website
 Swimming Results

 
2018 in swimming
2018 in Japanese sport
2018